Maurice Multhaup (born 15 December 1996) is a German professional footballer who plays as a midfielder for Eintracht Braunschweig.

Honours
Schalke 04 U19
 Under 19 Bundesliga: 2014–15
 DFB-Pokal U19 runner-up: 2013–14

References

1996 births
Living people
German footballers
Association football midfielders
Germany youth international footballers
FC Schalke 04 players
FC Ingolstadt 04 players
1. FC Heidenheim players
VfL Osnabrück players
Eintracht Braunschweig players
Bundesliga players
2. Bundesliga players
Regionalliga players
People from Bottrop
Sportspeople from Münster (region)
Footballers from North Rhine-Westphalia